Repomucenus is a genus of dragonets native to the Indian Ocean and the western Pacific Ocean.  This genus also includes one freshwater species (R. olidus).

Species
There are currently five recognized species in this genus:
 Repomucenus calcaratus (W. J. Macleay, 1881) (Spotted stinkfish)
 Repomucenus  huguenini (Bleeker, 1858 (Hugeunin's dragonet)
 Repomucenus olidus (Günther, 1873) (Chinese darter dragonet)
 Repomucenus ornatipinnis (Regan, 1905) (Japanese ornate dragonet)
 Repomucenus virgis  (Jordan & Fowler, 1903) (Virgin dragonet)

References

Callionymidae
Marine fish genera
Taxa named by Gilbert Percy Whitley